During the 1995–96 English football season, Portsmouth F.C. competed in the Football League First Division.

Season summary
In Terry Fenwick's first full season in charge of Portsmouth, relegation to Division Two was avoided on the last day of the 1995–96 season (on goal difference) when Pompey won away at Huddersfield Town while other results went the club's way.

Final league table

Results
Portsmouth's score comes first

Legend

Football League First Division

FA Cup

League Cup

Squad

Portsmouth F.C. seasons
Portsmouth